Kolga may refer to:

Places in Estonia
Kolga, small borough in Kuusalu Parish, Harju County
Kolga, Hiiu County, village in Käina Parish, Hiiu County
Kolga, Tartu County, village in Nõo Parish, Tartu County
Kolga, Võru County, village in Rõuge Parish, Võru County
Kolga Bay
Kolga River
Kolga Nature Reserve in Varbla Parish, Pärnu County

Other
*191 Kolga, Main belt asteroid, named after Kólga

See also
Kolka (disambiguation)
Kolgaküla